The 1981 San Francisco State Gators football team represented San Francisco State University as a member of the Far Western Conference (FWC) during the 1981 NCAA Division II football season. Led by 21st-year head coach Vic Rowen, San Francisco State compiled an overall record of 3–7 with a mark of 0–5 in conference play, placing last out of six teams in the FWC. For the season the team outscored its opponents 171 to 162. The Gators played home games at Cox Stadium in San Francisco.

Schedule

References

San Francisco State
San Francisco State Gators football seasons
San Francisco State Gators football